Route 21 is a bus route operated by the Maryland Transit Administration in Baltimore. The line currently runs from the Mondawmin Metro Subway Station to Fells Point, serving the corridors of Gilmor Street, Preston/Biddle Streets, and Caroline Street, and the communities of Sandtown-Winchester, Mt. Royal, and Butcher's Hill. The bus route is the successor to the 21 Preston Street–Caroline Street and Dolphin Street streetcar lines.

History
Route 21 was electrified in 1895 as a streetcar line along Preston and Caroline Streets. In 1938, the line was converted to a rubber tire bus service.

In 1957, the line was extended along Carey Street to the current loop at Cumberland and Carey Streets. The line did not have any routing changes until February 8, 2009, when it was extended north to the Mondawmin Metro Subway Station along Pennsylvania Avenue.

References
1929 Baltimore Streetcar map, provided by Baltimore Streetcar Museum

Route 021
Transportation at Johns Hopkins Hospital
1938 establishments in Maryland